The Shah Rokn al-Din Bathhouse or Bath of Shah Rukn al-Din dates back to the Safavid period and is located in Dezful, Shah district of Rokn al-Din, and this record was registered as a national monument of Iran on May 9, 1382 with the registration number 8379.

Restoration and transformation of the bathroom into the library 
In 2006, Shamsi was quoted as saying by the IRNA media that the bath of Rokn al-Din Shah is being repaired. Gholam Ali Baghban, director of the cultural heritage of Dezful, announced that measures such as water and sewage network reform, the redevelopment of electricity grids and redevelopment are ongoing, and after a long time the reconstruction of the place has become a cafe and library.

Gallery

See also 

 Cultural Heritage, Handicrafts and Tourism Organization of Iran
Importance and place of shrine King Rok Al-Din' mausoleum in the old texture of Dezful city

References 

National works of Iran
Public libraries
Public baths in Iran